John Kennedy is a former American slalom canoeist who competed in the late 1970s. He won a silver medal in the mixed C-2 event at the 1977 ICF Canoe Slalom World Championships in Spittal.

References

American male canoeists
Living people
Year of birth missing (living people)
Medalists at the ICF Canoe Slalom World Championships